The 1969 Detroit Tigers season was a season in American baseball. The team finished a distant second in the newly established American League East with a record of 90–72, 19 games behind the Baltimore Orioles.

Offseason 
 October 15, 1968: Dick Drago was drafted from the Tigers by the Kansas City Royals as the 31st pick in the 1968 Major League Baseball expansion draft.
 December 15, 1968: Dennis Ribant was purchased from the Tigers by the Kansas City Royals.
 February 1, 1969: John Young was drafted by the Tigers in the 1st round (16th pick) of the 1969 Major League Baseball draft (Secondary Phase).

Regular season

Season standings

Record vs. opponents

Notable transactions 
 June 14, 1969: Ron Woods was traded by the Tigers to the New York Yankees for Tom Tresh.
 August 8, 1969: Don McMahon was traded by the Tigers to the San Francisco Giants for a player to be named later. The Giants completed the deal by sending César Gutiérrez to the Tigers on September 2.

Roster

Player stats

Batting

Starters by position 
Note: Pos = Position; G = Games played; AB = At bats; H = Hits; Avg. = Batting average; HR = Home runs; RBI = Runs batted in

Other batters 
Note: G = Games played; AB = At bats; H = Hits; Avg. = Batting average; HR = Home runs; RBI = Runs batted in

Pitching

Starting pitchers 
Note: G = Games pitched; IP = Innings pitched; W = Wins; L = Losses; ERA = Earned run average; SO = Strikeouts

Other pitchers 
Note: G = Games pitched; IP = Innings pitched; W = Wins; L = Losses; ERA = Earned run average; SO = Strikeouts

Relief pitchers 
Note: G = Games pitched; W = Wins; L = Losses; SV = Saves; ERA = Earned run average; SO = Strikeouts

Farm system

Awards and honors 
Al Kaline, Hutch Award

Notes

References 

1969 Detroit Tigers season at Baseball Reference

Detroit Tigers seasons
Detroit Tigers season
Detroit Tiger
1969 in Detroit